419 may refer to:
419, the year 419 C.E.
419 (number)
Advance-fee fraud, also known as the 419 scam, the Nigerian scam, and the Nigerian money transfer fraud
Area code 419, which is the area code of the northwestern corner of Ohio
419 (police code), police hundred code for dead human body
UN M49 code for Latin America and the Caribbean.
419 (novel), an award-winning novel by Will Ferguson
The original title for the Charles Stross novel Rule 34